Latvia-Poland relations are foreign relations between Latvia and Poland.  Poland recognised Latvia's independence on 27 January 1921, at a time when the two countries had a common border. After the fall of the USSR, both countries re-established diplomatic relations on August 30, 1991.   There are around 57,000 Poles living in Latvia.

Both countries are full members of NATO, the European Union, OECD, OSCE, Bucharest Nine, Three Seas Initiative, Council of Europe, Council of the Baltic Sea States and HELCOM.

The Polish Air Force takes part in the NATO Baltic Air Policing mission to guard the airspace over the Baltic states including Latvia. Since 2017, a Polish military contingent has been stationed in Latvia as part of the NATO Enhanced Forward Presence defense forces.
The two countries became members of the European Union in 2004.

Resident diplomatic missions 
 Latvia has an embassy in Warsaw.
 Poland has an embassy in Riga.

See also  
 Foreign relations of Latvia
 Foreign relations of Poland
 Poles in Latvia
 2004 enlargement of the European Union

External links 
  Latvian Ministry of Foreign Affairs about relations with Poland
  Latvian embassy in Warsaw (in Latvian and Polish only)
  Polish embassy in Riga

 

 
Poland
Bilateral relations of Poland